A spirit house is a shrine to the protective spirit of a place that is found in the Southeast Asian countries of Burma, Cambodia, Laos, Thailand, Malaysia, Indonesia, Vietnam and the Philippines. The spirit house is normally in the form of small roofed structure, and is mounted on a pillar or on a dais. They can range in size from small platforms to houses large enough for people to enter. Spirit houses are intended to provide a shelter for spirits that could cause problems for the people if not appeased. The shrines often include images or carved statues of people and animals. Votive offerings are left at the house to propitiate the spirits. More elaborate installations include an altar for this purpose.

In Indochina,  most houses and businesses have a spirit house placed in an auspicious spot, most often in a corner of the property. The location may be chosen after consultation with a Brahmin priest.

In maritime Southeast Asia, spirit houses are connected to the various traditional animistic rituals involving spirits. In the Philippines, spirit houses are dedicated to ceremonies or offerings involving the anito spirits. They are also referred to as shrines.

Spirit house offerings
In Cambodia, the most common offering are fruits (e.g. banana, orange, grape; some people even offer different fruits at the same time.) In neighbouring Thailand however, it is a long-standing tradition to leave offerings of food and drink at the spirit house. Rice, bananas, coconuts, and desserts are common offerings. Most ubiquitous is red, strawberry-flavoured Fanta. The idea seems to be that friendly spirits will congregate to enjoy free food and drink and their presence will serve to keep more malign spirits at bay. The popularity of red Fanta offerings has existed for decades. Opinions as to "why Fanta?" vary. Most point to the significance of the colour red, reminiscent of animal sacrifice, or perhaps related to the practice of anchoring red incense sticks in a glass of water which promptly tints the water red. Sweetness is explained by the observation that sweet spirits naturally have sweet tooths.

Gallery

See also 

 Anito
 Di Penates
 Erawan Shrine
 Genius loci
 Lak Mueang
 Lares
 Nat (spirit)
 Phra Phrom
 Thai folklore
 Tutelary deity

References

Austronesian spirituality
Tutelary deities
Thai culture
Laotian culture
Cambodian culture
Animism in Asia
Religion in Thailand
Religion in Laos
Religion in Cambodia
Asian shamanism